Stryker is a Philippine action film directed by Cirio H. Santiago.  The film is set in the future where after a nuclear holocaust, survivors battle each other over the remaining water in the world.

Plot

After nuclear war has defoliated the Earth, the survivors live in colonies in an endless quest for drinkable water. A young woman named Delha is on the run from the evil warlord Kardis and his henchman. She is rescued by Stryker and his young companion Bandit. She later finds herself trapped again by Kardis and resists torture to reveal the location of her colony.

Meanwhile, Stryker and Bandit ambush a Kardis water tanker, drive it to his fortress, and manage to escape with Delha. Delha reveals that she has been trying to contact Trun, Stryker's estranged brother, to assist in the defence against Kardis. Trun has been captured and buried by Kardis' men, but is rescued by Stryker. Trun has his lieutenant Bazil to gather his army, but Bazil suddenly betrays them, leading Kardis to attack the colony.

Stryker is then captured and tortured, but is rescued by a group of dwarves to whom he had previously given precious water. After a final climactic battle, Trun's battalion defeats Kardis' army with help of Stryker and the dwarves.

Reception
The Monthly Film Bulletin gave the film a negative review: "Workaday, predictable, edited to the bone, Stryker is very much a New World yarn. It cruises on automatic pilot from the first frame to the last."

Variety described the film as a: "Grade-D imitation of "The Road Warrior...'Stryker' offers little for today's action audience."

The review described Howard R. Cohen's script as "insane" and leading man Steve Sandor as "ugly", as well as a "combination imitation of Indiana Jones and Mad Max", and that director Santiago's shots "rarely match, making for sloppy editing and enervating tedium".

In Phil Hardy's book Science Fiction (1984), a review compared to other Mad Max derivatives, noting it was "even more ridiculous than its Italian competitor I Nuovi Barbari (1983)", lamenting lamented that director Santiago "used to turn out at least halfway decent movies for Roger Corman's New World from his Filipino base including Fly Me, Savage! (both 1973), TNT Jackson (1975) and the like."

See also
List of action films of the 1980s
List of Philippine films of the 1980s
Mad Max series legacy and influence in popular culture

References

Footnotes

Sources

External links

Philippine science fiction action films
1980s science fiction action films
Films set in the future
Philippine post-apocalyptic films
1980s English-language films
Films directed by Cirio H. Santiago